The 2018 St Albans City and District Council election took place on 3 May 2018 to elect members of St Albans City and District Council in England. This was on the same day as other local elections.

Summary Results

Ward results

Ashley

Batchwood

Clarence

Colney Heath

Cunningham

Harpenden East

Harpenden North

Harpenden South

Harpenden West

London Colney

Marshalswick North

Marshalswick South

Park Street

Redbourn

Sandridge

Sopwell

St Peters

St Stephen

Verulam

Wheathampstead

References

St Albans City and District Council elections